Danau, also spelt Danaw, is a Mon–Khmer language of Myanmar (Burma). It is the most divergent member of the Palaungic branch (Sidwell 2010). Danau is spoken by about 5,000 people near Aungban, Kalaw Township, Shan State. Danaw was classified as a "critically endangered" language in UNESCO's 2010 Atlas of the World’s Languages in Danger.

Name

Speakers
The Danau are a little known ethnic group in Myanmar. Even in the nearby town of Aungban, it is common for people to confuse this group with the local Danu majority. According to historical accounts, the Danu had served as archers for King Alaungpaya, who founded the Konbaung Dynasty in the 18th century. The Danu settled in the Pindaya region after returning from wars in Thailand, and speak a variant of Burmese that is characterised by minor differences in pronunciation. The Danau, on the other hand speak a completely different Austroasiatic language, which nevertheless has numerous words borrowed from Burmese (and also ultimately from Pali via Burmese).

The Danau live primarily in the villages of Taungbohla, Thaethit, Htinyugon, Chaunggya and Naung In, within a short distance of the towns of Aungban and Heho. As these villages are surrounded by Pa'O villages, Danau people tend to speak Pa'O as well as Burmese. In spite of the small size of the Danau-speaking population, the language is vigorous and being taught to children. The current situation is in contrast to the prediction made by the linguist Gordon H. Luce in 1965, when he called Danau a 'dying' language. The Danau people are primarily farmers, growing sesame, turmeric, ginger, chilli, groundnut and potato for local consumption and for sale at nearby markets.

Phonology
Danau is a tonal language with four tones according to some sources, while others, including native speakers, identify three tones.

References

Further reading
A preliminary documentation of Danau, an endangered language of Myanmar (Burma)
Aung Si. 2014. Documentation of Danau, an endangered language of Myanmar (Burma). Endangered Languages Archive.
Aung Si. 2014. Documenting Bird Names in Danaw. Conference presentation, SEALS 24.
Shintani, Tadahiko. 2020. The Kanaw (Danaw) language. Linguistic survey of Tay cultural area (LSTCA) no. 127. Tokyo: Research Institute for Languages and Cultures of Asia and Africa (ILCAA).

External links 
 ELAR archive of Documentation of Danau

Palaungic languages
Languages of Myanmar